Reinwardtiodendron is a genus of plants in the family Meliaceae, described by  Sijfert Hendrik Koorders and found in south-east Asia.  The type species is: R. celebicum Koord.

Species
 Reinwardtiodendron anamalaiense (Bedd.) Mabb.
 Reinwardtiodendron celebicum Koord.
 Reinwardtiodendron cinereum (Hiern) Mabb.
 Reinwardtiodendron humile (Hassk.) Mabb.
 Reinwardtiodendron kinabaluense (Kosterm.) Mabb.
 Reinwardtiodendron kostermansii (Prijanto) Mabb.
 Reinwardtiodendron merrillii Perkins

References

External links
 
 

Meliaceae genera
Meliaceae
Taxa named by Sijfert Hendrik Koorders